The True False Identity is the sixth studio album by T Bone Burnett, released in 2006.

Track listing
All tracks composed by T Bone Burnett, except where indicated.

"Zombieland" (Burnett, Turner Stephen Bruton) - 5:57
"Palestine Texas" - 4:47
"Seven Times Hotter Than Fire" - 4:41
"There Would Be Hell to Pay" - 5:10
"Every Time I Feel the Shift" - 6:52
"I'm Going On a Long Journey Never to Return" – 5:21
"Hollywood Mecca of the Movies" (Burnett, Marc Ribot) - 3:26
"Fear Country" (Burnett, Bob Neuwirth, Donnie Fritts) - 6:15
"Baby Don't You Say You Love Me" - 4:08
"Earlier Baghdad (The Bounce)" - 4:55
"Blinded by the Darkness" - 5:18
"Shaken Rattled and Rolled" - 2:40

Personnel
 T Bone Burnett – vocals, guitar, six–string bass
 Marc Ribot – guitars
 Dennis Crouch – bass guitar
 Keith Ciancia – piano, keyboards
 Jim Keltner – drums
 Carla Azar – drums
 Bill Maxwell – drums
 Jay Bellerose – drums
 Sam Phillips – backing vocals
 Daniel Moore – backing vocals
 Buzz Clifford – backing vocals

2006 albums
T Bone Burnett albums
Albums produced by T Bone Burnett